Sense of ownership (SO), in psychology, is the feeling of identifying sensations (both internal and external) as affecting, establishing, and belonging to one's identified-self..

At least three different types of bodily self-experiences can be experimentally identified as separable processes: self-identification (i.e. ownership of one's bodily sensations), self-location (i.e., the experience of self situated in a specific space), and first person-perspective (i.e., the loci of experiencing and perceiving reality).

Self-identification 
Evidence for self-identification of body-ownership comes from cases of Body integrity dysphoria (BID) where effected individuals feel 'alienation' or over-completeness over parts of their body, and somatoparaphrenia where effected individuals' deny ownership to a part or to an entire section (i.e. unilateral neglect) of their body. Research from Dilk, M.T. (2013) show associated brain areas (with decreased activity) of the premotor cortex with non-identification of body parts (in patients who exhibit BID).

Self-location 
There is a large body of evidence suggesting the Temporoparietal junction (TPJ) influences body location: evidence comes from brain stimulation at the TPJ and associated out of body experiences.

See also 
Body schema
Extrastriate body area
Neural basis of self

References

Cognitive science
Conceptions of self